Tingena hastata is a species of moth in the family Oecophoridae. It is endemic to New Zealand and has been observed in the southern part of the South Island. Adults of this species are on the wing in October.

Taxonomy
This species was first described by Alfred Philpott in 1916 using a specimen collected at Seaward Moss (now known as part of Awarua Plains), near Invercargill, in October and named Borkhausenia hastata. George Hudson discussed and illustrated this species under the name B. hastata in his 1928 publication The butterflies and moths of New Zealand. In 1988 J. S. Dugdale placed this species within the genus Tingena. The male holotype is held in the New Zealand Arthropod Collection.

Description

Philpott described this species as follows:
This species can be confused with T. chloradelpha but can be distinguished as T. hastata has narrower and more pointed forewings with greyer colouring and darker terminal and discal dots.

Distribution 
This species is endemic to New Zealand and has been observed in the southern parts of the South Island including at Gem Lake at an altitude of 1300 m.

Behaviour 
This species is on the wing in October.

References 

Oecophoridae
Moths of New Zealand
Moths described in 1916
Endemic fauna of New Zealand
Taxa named by Alfred Philpott
Endemic moths of New Zealand